Hoyleton Township is located in Washington County, Illinois. As of the 2010 census, its population was 1,142 and it contained 459 housing units. The village of Hoyleton is entirely within Hoyleton Township, and the eastern part of the village of New Minden is also within the township.

Geography

Demographics

References

External links
City-data.com
Illinois State Archives

Townships in Washington County, Illinois
Townships in Illinois